Miss Polski 2009 was the 20th Miss Polski pageant, held on September 4, 2009. The winner was Anna Jamróz of Pomerania. In addition to receiving the title Jamróz also received a Ford Ka Grand Prix. She represented Poland in Miss World 2009 and Miss Supranational 2010. 1st Runner-Up Monika Lewczuk represented the country at Miss Supranational 2011.

Final results

Special Awards

Judges
 Gerhard Parzutka von Lipiński - President of the Miss Polski competition
 Klaudia Ungerman - Miss Polski 2008
 Edyta Herbuś - Dancer, Actress
 Zygmunt Chajzer - TV Presenter
 Lech Daniłowicz - President and Owner of Missland
 Rafał Kałuża - President of the Powermed company
 Przemysław Saleta - World Champion in Kickboxing
 Krzysztof Hołowczyc - A Rally Driver
 Maciej Rock - TV Presenter
 Marek Kubiczek - President of the Powermed company

Finalists

Notes

Did not compete
 Lower Poland
 Lublin
 Opole
 Subcarpathia
 Polish Community in Argentina
 Polish Community in Australia
 Polish Community in Belarus
 Polish Community in Brazil
 Polish Community in Canada
 Polish Community in France
 Polish Community in Germany
 Polish Community in Ireland
 Polish Community in Israel
 Polish Community in Lithuania
 Polish Community in Russia
 Polish Community in South Africa
 Polish Community in Sweden
 Polish Community in the U.K.
 Polish Community in the U.S.
 Polish Community in Venezuela

References

External links
Official Website

2009
2009 beauty pageants
2009 in Poland